Henry Boyd Hucles III (September 21, 1923 – August 4, 1989) was suffragan bishop of the Episcopal Diocese of Long Island, serving from his consecration on June 20, 1981 to his death in 1989.

Biography 
Hucles was born in New York City on September 21, 1923, the son of Henry B. Hucles, Jr. and Alma Leola Lewis. He was educated in public school in New York City and later graduated from Virginia Union University with a Bachelor of Science in 1943. He then attended Bishop Payne Divinity School, which later merged with Virginia Theological Seminary, and graduated with a Bachelor of Divinity in 1946.

He was ordained deacon in July 1946 and priest in September 1947 by Wiley Roy Mason, Suffragan Bishop of Virginia. On September 18, 1948, hr married Mamie Dalceda Adams and together has 2 children. After ordination he became priest-in-charge of Grace Church in Millers Tavern, Virginia and of St Andrews Church in Upright, Virginia. In 1949 he became rector of St George's Church in Brooklyn, New York, eventually later becoming Archdeacon of Brooklyn, New York in 1979. He also became a member of the cathedral canons.

On March 14, 1981, Hucles was elected Suffragan Bishop of Long Island on the seventh ballot in the Cathedral of the Incarnation, Garden City, New York. He was then consecrated on June 20, 1981 by Presiding Bishop John Allin at the Cathedral of the Incarnation, Garden City, New York. He retired his post in 1988 and died a year later on August 4, 1989 in Virginia.

References

External links
 Brooklyn Eagle story
 

1923 births
1989 deaths
20th-century American clergy
20th-century American Episcopalians
Episcopal bishops of Long Island
Religious leaders from New York City
Virginia Union University alumni
Virginia Theological Seminary alumni